The Culvert Chronicles is an American weekly newspaper geared to the African-American community of New York City.

Establishment
The Culvert Chronicles was founded in 2005 and is headquartered in Laurelton, Queens.
It has a circulation of 125,000 within the metropolitan area.

External links
official website

Newspapers published in Queens, New York
African-American newspapers published in New York (state)